Goff is a city in Nemaha County, Kansas, United States.  As of the 2020 census, the population of the city was 106.

History
Goff had its start in the year 1880 by the building of the railroad through that territory. It was named for Edward H. Goff, an official of the Central Branch Union Pacific Railroad.

The name of the post office was officially spelled Goff's from 1880 until 1894.

Geography
Goff is located at  (39.665867, -95.931546).

Demographics

2010 census
As of the census of 2010, there were 126 people, 49 households, and 34 families residing in the city. The racial makeup of the city was 90.5% White, 1.6% Native American, 0.8% Asian, and 7.1% from two or more races. Hispanic or Latino of any race were 0.8% of the population.

There were 49 households, of which 40.8% had children under the age of 18 living with them, 46.9% were married couples living together, 12.2% had a female householder with no husband present, 10.2% had a male householder with no wife present, and 30.6% were non-families. 22.4% of all households were made up of individuals, and 6.1% had someone living alone who was 65 years of age or older. The average household size was 2.57 and the average family size was 3.09.

The median age in the city was 33.3 years. 34.1% of residents were under the age of 18; 3.9% were between the ages of 18 and 24; 23.1% were from 25 to 44; 23.9% were from 45 to 64; and 15.1% were 65 years of age or older. The gender makeup of the city was 57.1% male and 42.9% female.

2000 census
As of the census of 2000, there were 181 people, 60 households, and 43 families residing in the city. The racial makeup of the city was 91.16% White, 1.66% African American, 2.21% Native American, 0.55% Asian, and 4.42% from two or more races. Hispanic or Latino of any race were 2.76% of the population.

There were 60 households, out of which 43.3% had children under the age of 18 living with them, 55.0% were married couples living together, 15.0% had a female householder with no husband present, and 26.7% were non-families. 25.0% of all households were made up of individuals, and 13.3% had someone living alone who was 65 years of age or older. The average household size was 3.02 and the average family size was 3.66.

In the city, the population was spread out, with 38.1% under the age of 18, 9.9% from 18 to 24, 24.9% from 25 to 44, 14.9% from 45 to 64, and 12.2% who were 65 years of age or older. The median age was 26 years. For every 100 females, there were 108.0 males. For every 100 females age 18 and over, there were 96.5 males.

The median income for a household in the city was $35,781, and the median income for a family was $36,667. Males had a median income of $27,500 versus $18,542 for females. The per capita income for the city was $13,028. None of the population or families were below the poverty line.

Education
The community is served by Prairie Hills USD 113 public school district.

References

External links
 Goff - Directory of Public Officials
 Goff city map, KDOT

Cities in Kansas
Cities in Nemaha County, Kansas
1880 establishments in Kansas
Populated places established in 1880